Abigail Chamungwana largely known by her stage names Abigail Chams and Abby Chams is a Tanzanian multi-instrumentalist, social activist and a singer signed under Sony Music.

Music career 
Born into a musical family, Abby Chams' grandfather was a music director of an orchestra also her grandmother was a singer in the church choir, she started learning piano when she was five and mastered the violin by eight she also mastered guitar, drummer and flute.

She started her career by posting music covers on her social accounts. She has collaborated with top Tanzanian musical artists like Rayvanny and Harmonize (singer). She has also worked with foreign musical artists like Jekalyn Carr.

In 2022 she was signed to Sony Music Africa joining her countryman, Ali Kiba.

Social activities 
In 2020 Abby Chams was named a youth advocate by UNICEF in Tanzania on mental health and gender equality during International Children's Day 2020 also performed in expo 2020 in Dubai. She started the youth program called "Teen Talks With Abby Chams", as a safe place for young people to talk  on the challenges they face and discuss solutions to also fix mental health issues. She is also an ambassador for the Tanzania Chamber of Commerce, Industry and Agriculture.

Nominations and awards 
Tanzania Music Awards

|-
|2022
|Abby Chams
|Merging artist
|
|-

Discography 
Closer featuring harmonize
Tucheze
Chapa rapa
U&I

References 

21st-century Tanzanian women singers
People from Dar es Salaam
Living people
Swahili-language singers
Tanzanian musicians
Tanzanian Bongo Flava musicians
2003 births